Diana Rosemary Shand is a New Zealand environmentalist.

Biography 
In the late 1980s Shand served on the Human Rights Commission. She has also served on the Canterbury Regional Council and was National Programme Manager for the New Zealand office of the non-profit organisation ICLEI – Local Governments for Sustainability, which delivered a Communities for Climate Protection Programme in 2008.

She is the regional councillor for Oceania for the international NGO International Union for Conservation of Nature (IUCN). She is also a member of the executive of Environment and Conservation Organisations of Aotearoa New Zealand.

References

Living people
Year of birth missing (living people)
People from Christchurch
New Zealand environmentalists
Canterbury regional councillors